Events from the year 1161 in Ireland.

Incumbents
 High King: Muirchertach Mac Lochlainn

Deaths
Archbishop Gregory, Archbishop of Dublin
Ragnall Ua Dálaigh, poet.

References

Years of the 12th century in Ireland